Megan Sloan Parlen (born July 9, 1980) is an American actress. She is best known for her role as Mary-Beth Pepperton on the NBC series Hang Time (1995–2000).

In 2005, she received a Master's degree in broadcast journalism from the University of Southern California Annenberg School for Communication.  She has since become an Executive Producer/Creative Director in documentary content.

Filmography

Acting
 Walk Like a Man (1987) ... as Little Girl
 Hardball, in episode "The Silver Scream"
 Sisters (1990) (CBS TV pilot) ... as Tina Wyles
 My Heroes Have Always Been Cowboys (1991) ... as Becky
 Snoopy's Reunion (1991) (TV movie) (voice) ... as Lillian "Lila" Emmons Allcroft
 Star Trek: The Next Generation (1992), in episode "Rascals" ... as young Ro Laren
 Boy Meets World (1993), in episode "Cory's Alternative Friends" ... as Barbara
 Lois & Clark: The New Adventures of Superman (1994), in episode "Witness" ... as Girl #1
 Dad, the Angel and Me (1995) (TV movie) ... as Charlotte
 Hang Time (1995–2000) ... as Mary-Beth Pepperton (main role)
 Saved by the Bell: The New Class (1996), in episode "The Kiss" ... as Mary Beth Pepperton
 Something So Right (1997), in episodes "Something About Secrets & Rules", "Something About Two April Fools" ... as Cindy
 Elysium (2003) (voice) ... as Lydia
 Gladius (2003) (voice) ... as Additional Voices
 Tony Hawk's Underground (2003) (voice)
 Nicktoons Movin' Eye Toy (2004) ... as Reggie Rocket
 Intel:USA (2007–2012)... as Leona McCormick (series 1, 3, 5, 6)

Producing
 This Film Is Not Yet Rated (2006) (associate producer)
 Operation Homecoming (2007) (production coordinator)
 Young Scientists (2008) (associate producer)
 Popular Science's Future Of... (2009) (producer)
 National Geographic Explorer: Born to Rage (2010) (associate producer)
 Vanished from Alcatraz (2010) (associate producer)
 Through the Wormhole with Morgan Freeman (2010: associate producer; 2011–2013: producer)

Awards and nominations

References

External links 
 

1980 births
Living people
American child actresses
American film actresses
American television actresses
American voice actresses
Actresses from Los Angeles
USC Annenberg School for Communication and Journalism alumni